Brent Wong (born 1945) is a New Zealand surrealist painter and music composer.

Early life
Originally from Otaki, Wong's family moved to Wellington in 1949, where he has subsequently lived. As a child, he had difficulty reading, which led him towards drawing as an alternative means of self-expression.

Art career
Wong's first solo exhibition was in 1969 at the Rothmans Gallery in Wellington when he was 24. The exhibition "excited extravagant critical attention: and overnight established the previously unknown Brent Wong as an important painter in the local context."

See also
New Zealand art
List of New Zealand artists

References

External links
Brent Wong – painter, website cataloguing his early artworks
Page on the Te Papa website

1945 births
Living people
People from Wellington City
People from Ōtaki, New Zealand
New Zealand surrealist artists
New Zealand composers
Male composers
20th-century New Zealand painters
20th-century New Zealand male artists
21st-century New Zealand painters
21st-century New Zealand male artists
20th-century composers
21st-century composers
20th-century male musicians
21st-century male musicians